The Journey is the 42nd book in the Animorphs series, written by K. A. Applegate and published in May 2000. It is known to have been ghostwritten by Emily Costello. The book is narrated primarily by Rachel and secondarily by Marco.

Plot summary
A boy takes a picture of the Animorphs while they are demorphing in an alley after a mission. They track the boy down and decide to keep watch on him. When they go to Cassie's barn to reconvene, the Helmacrons show up and demand the morphing cube, because they need it to charge their ship. In the ensuing battle, the Helmacrons leave the ship and enter Marco's nose. The Animorphs decide to use the Helmacron ship to shrink themselves so they can follow the Helmacrons and stop them from killing Marco from the inside. When they shrink, they realize they are too small to hear the speech of full-size humans, which didn't happen the last time they were shrunk. When they catch up to the Helmacrons inside Marco's nose, they notice that they have been shrunk to 1/100th the size of the Helmacrons, who tweaked the shrinking device before they left their ship, knowing that the Animorphs would shrink themselves so they could go after them. 

Meanwhile, Marco is bored of just sitting around and decides to go over to the apartment of the boy who took their picture to try to steal his camera. He goes up a fire escape and enters through a window, but before he can even pick up the camera, he gets bitten by a dog and flees home. Rachel falls down into Marco's stomach, and the Helmacrons as well as the rest of the Animorphs follow her, where they are shortly burnt by stomach acid, before morphing into sharks and following the Helmacrons into the bloodstream. 

In the bloodstream, Rachel notices a pathogen while looking at all of the different types of blood cells around them. They realize that when the Helmacrons reach the heart, they can stop it from beating with their weapons. Marco goes back to the apartment a second time, and while he is there someone comes home. He soon finds himself trapped in the closet, and against Jake's orders, morphs a cockroach. The Helmacrons shoot at the cockroach's heart, after which everyone believes Marco is dead, until they remember that cockroaches can withstand severe trauma. In the meantime, the Animorphs get the weapons away from the Helmacrons by biting their legs. Marco is indeed alive, and they manage to get him to morph back to human. Holding the Helmacrons at gunpoint, they all return to the barn and recharge the Helmacron's ship with the morphing cube. The Helmacrons leave earth again after promising to never come back. 

Later at home, Rachel discovers that the pathogen she saw in Marco's bloodstream was rabies, and his near-death experience actually saved him from the virus. Rachel considers calling Jake and informing the team about it, but decides to put it off until the morning.

Morphs

Animorphs books
2000 novels
Human body in popular culture
Fiction about size change
Novels with multiple narrators